Garges–Sarcelles is a railway station in Île-de-France. The station is served by the RER D and serves the communes of Garges-lès-Gonesse and Sarcelles.

The station is also the terminus of Île-de-France tramway Line 5.

External links

 

Railway stations in Val-d'Oise
Réseau Express Régional stations